Celaenorrhinus hecqui is a species of butterfly in the family Hesperiidae.

Habitat
It is found in Ituri, in the Democratic Republic of the Congo.

References

Butterflies described in 1976
hecqui
Endemic fauna of the Democratic Republic of the Congo